Phycocyanobilin is a blue phycobilin, i.e., a tetrapyrrole chromophore found in cyanobacteria and in the chloroplasts of red algae, glaucophytes, and some cryptomonads. Phycocyanobilin is present only in the phycobiliproteins allophycocyanin and phycocyanin, of which it is the terminal acceptor of energy. It is covalently linked to these phycobiliproteins by a thioether bond.

Phycocyanobilin, PCB, has the ability to bind to human serum albumin, HSA, protein found mainly in the blood of humans. This PCB-HCA complex benefits the structure of HSA, increasing the thermal stability of HSA, as well as increasing its ability to prevent against proteolytic activity of other proteins.

References

Further reading 

  

Photosynthetic pigments
Tetrapyrroles